This is a list of institutions of higher education in Switzerland that offer programs in hospitality management studies that are Certified by the Swiss national quality label for further education institutions (EduQua) and other accreditations including: EFMD, ISO ASIC, ECBE and IACBE.

Private hospitality schools in Switzerland 

 Business and Hotel Management School - Switzerland - BHMS 
 Cesar Ritz Colleges 
 Culinary Arts Academy Switzerland- CAA  
 École hôtelière de Lausanne- EHL 
 École hôtelière de Genève- EHG
 EU Business School (Geneva and Montreux campus) 
 Geneva Business School - GBS  
 Glion Institute of Higher Education- GLION  
 Hotel Institute Montreux - HIM 
  HTMi, Hotel and Tourism Management Institute Switzerland- HTMi  
 International School of Business Management - ISBM 
 International Management Institute Switzerland- IMI 
 Les Roches International School of Hotel Management- Les Roches  
 SHL Schweizerische Hotelfachschule Luzern- SHL
 Swiss Hotel Management School- SHMS  
 Swiss School of Tourism and Hospitality- SSTH   
 Swiss Institute for Management and Hospitality- SWISS IM&H

Public Universities offering Hospitality programs
 Lucerne University of Applied Sciences and Arts - SHL Schweizerische Hotelfachschule Luzern
 University of Applied Sciences Western Switzerland - École hôtelière de Lausanne- EHL (Affiliated to the University of Applied Sciences Western Switzerland HES-SO )

Not working anymore
 DCT University Center Hospitality Leadership & European Culinary Arts
 LRG University of Applied Sciences (EduQua Certified)
 International Hotel and Tourism Training Institute- IHTTI

See also
Swiss national quality label for further education institutions (EduQua)

Notes and References
 Official website of Business and Hotel Management School - Switzerland - BHMS  
 Official website of Swiss Hotel Management School - SHMS

 
Switzerland
Switzerland education-related lists